Sodium channel, voltage-gated, type III, alpha subunit (SCN3A) is a  protein that in humans is encoded by the SCN3A gene.

Function 

Voltage-gated sodium channels are transmembrane glycoprotein complexes composed of a large alpha subunit with 24 transmembrane domains and one or more regulatory beta subunits. They are responsible for the generation and propagation of action potentials in neurons and muscle. This gene encodes one member of the sodium channel alpha subunit gene family, and is found in a cluster of five alpha subunit genes on chromosome 2. Multiple transcript variants encoding different isoforms have been found for this gene.

SCN3A is involved in gyrification – the folding of the human cerebral cortex, and affects speech production brain areas.

References

Further reading

External links 
 

Sodium channels